{{DISPLAYTITLE:C15H18}}
The molecular formula C15H18 (molar mass: 198.30 g/mol) may refer to:

 Cadalene, or cadalin
 Guaiazulene, also known as azulon or 1,4-dimethyl-7-isopropylazulene
 Vetivazulene

Molecular formulas